Benfield is an English toponymic surname from one or more of the numerous places in England called Benfield or Binfield. Notable people with this name include:

 Andrea Benfield (born 1978), English journalist
 Christopher Benfield Carter (1844–1906), Canadian politician
 Derek Benfield (1926–2009), British playwright and actor
 Fred Benfield (1937–2007), Australian rower who competed in the 1956 Summer Olympics
 John Benfield (1951–2020), British actor, who has appeared in 75 TV episodes or films starting in 1981
 Robert Benfield (died 1649), seventeenth-century actor, longtime member of the King's Men
 Tommy Benfield (1889–1918), English footballer
 Warren Benfield (1913–2001), classical double bass player
William Avery Benfield, Jr (1917–1988), Presbyterian minister, charismatic world evangelist

See also 
 Benfield Group, reinsurance and risk intermediary
 Benfield School, 11–18 state comprehensive school in Walkergate, Newcastle upon Tyne, England
 Newcastle Benfield F.C., football club based in Newcastle upon Tyne, England

See also 
 
 Benefield, a spelling variation

References 

English toponymic surnames